The Roxbury Latin School is a private boys' day school that was founded in 1645 in the town of Roxbury (now a neighborhood of Boston, Massachusetts) by the Rev. John Eliot under a charter received from King Charles I of England.  It bills itself as the "oldest independent school in continuous existence" in North America.

Located since 1927 at 101 St. Theresa Avenue in the West Roxbury neighborhood of Boston, the school now serves roughly 300 boys in grades seven through twelve. Eliot founded the school "to fit [students] for public service both in church and in commonwealth in succeeding ages," and the school still considers instilling a desire to perform public service among its principal missions.

The school's endowment is estimated at $189 million, the largest of any boys' day school in the United States.  The school maintains a need-blind admissions policy, admitting boys without consideration of the ability of their families to pay the full tuition.

Its previous headmaster, F. Washington Jarvis, who retired in the summer of 2004 after a 30-year tenure, published two books about Roxbury Latin: a history of the school and a collection of his speeches to boys at Roxbury Latin (With Love and Prayers).  The title of the former, Schola Illustris, was the phrase Cotton Mather used to describe the school in 1690, following John Eliot's death.  In addition to those books, Richard Walden Hale published Tercentenary History of the Roxbury Latin School in 1946.

Roxbury Latin is a member of the Independent School League and NEPSAC. It has an unofficial sister school relationship with the Winsor School in Boston as well as an African brother school, the Maru a Pula School.

Rankings
According to the school's website, the middle 50% SAT Scores for the Class of 2019 ranged from 1450 to 1570, with the breakdown being 710-770 for Evidence-Based Reading and Writing and 740-800 for Mathematics. The Class of 2021 profile describes that "the
median standardized testing of each class consistently hovers around 1500." Roxbury Latin  has among the highest median SAT averages of any private school.  A 2004 piece in The Wall Street Journal noted Roxbury Latin for its acceptance rates at the most competitive universities, despite maintaining a low tuition relative to its peers ($26,100 in 2013–2014). In 2003, Worth magazine ranked Roxbury Latin as the #1 "feeder school" for elite universities, with a larger portion of its graduating class attending Princeton University, Harvard University, or Yale University than any other school.

In 2008, the website PrepReview.com extended and updated the earlier survey by Worth magazine. Despite using more inclusive criteria in place of Worths narrow focus on Princeton, Harvard, and Yale, Roxbury Latin again topped the rankings. PrepReview.com looked at the number of matriculants to all eight Ivy League undergraduate colleges as well as to MIT and Stanford University. Roxbury Latin placed nearly half (45%) of its recent graduates among these institutions, the highest rate of any secondary school in the world. The 2008 rankings by PrepReview.com placed Roxbury Latin first in all of the following categories: America's Top 50 High Schools, America's Best High Schools Ranked by SAT, and America's Best Private Day Schools. Additionally, PrepReview.com ranked Roxbury Latin first in the world among secondary schools for its students' success at gaining admission to Harvard University: in 2009, 20% of the graduating class at Roxbury Latin matriculated at Harvard. In 2010, Forbes magazine ranked Roxbury Latin fifth in a list of the top 10 prep schools in America. In 2015, TheStreet ranked Roxbury Latin among Top US Private Schools with the Most Graduates Getting Into Ivy League Universities.

Transportation
The school provides school bus service for some students who live in the Dorchester, South Boston, Hyde Park, Mattapan, and Roxbury neighborhoods of Boston. The school charges a nominal fee for the bus usage.

Athletics
The school has varsity, junior varsity and lower-level teams in football, cross country, soccer (fall), basketball, ice hockey, wrestling (winter), baseball, tennis, lacrosse, and track and field (spring). The school has a notable wrestling program, with the former varsity coach Steven E. Ward recently being inducted into the wrestling hall of fame in 2009. The varsity soccer team was co-champions with Rivers in the NEPSAC tournament in 2012. The Track & Field team has won the NEPSTA (New England Prep School Track Association) Championship in nine of the last eleven years, including five in a row from 2011 to 2015. The Track Team also won the ISTA (Independent School Track Association) Championship in 2012 and 2013. The Tennis team has won the ISL Championship in 2011, 2012, 2013, 2014, and 2015, and has been invited to the NEPSAC Class B Tennis Championship nine years in a row, winning the tournament in 2013 and finishing as runners-up in 2015.

Extracurriculars
The school has a wide variety of extracurricular activities for its students to partake in. The Model United Nations program and the Debate and Public Speaking program are especially popular, with approximately a hundred students in each. The school participates in many Model United Nations conferences and debate tournaments every year. Another moderately popular activity is Botball, an annual interscholastic robotics competition. The school team has done exceptionally well in recent years, placing 5th in the New England Division in 2009. In 2010, it placed 2nd out of 19 teams, a school record. The school also boasts several language clubs and a chess team that has won or shared the South Shore Interscholastic Chess League title in 2 of the last 5 years, as well as community service clubs, such as Habitat for Humanity.

Music
The school has an extensive music program, available to students of all grades.  There is junior chorus for seventh and eighth graders, and a glee club for high schoolers. There is also a small a cappella group consisting of about fourteen singers called the Latonics that requires an audition. Additionally, there is a jazz band and several halls a year devoted to instrumental performances by students and faculty.

Notable alumni

Colonists
 James Pierpont (1677), principal founder of Yale University
 Paul Dudley (1686), Chief Justice of Massachusetts Supreme Judicial Court (1745–1751) and Attorney General of Massachusetts (1702–1718)
 John Wise (1669), clergyman credited with revolutionary phrase "no taxation without representation"
 Joseph Warren (1755), Continental Army General who was killed at the Battle of Bunker Hill, surgeon
 Increase Sumner (1763), governor of Massachusetts (1797–1799), Justice of Massachusetts Supreme Judicial Court (1782–1797)
 John Warren (1767), founder of Harvard Medical School, renowned surgeon

Business
 Francis Cabot Lowell (1789), businessman, member of Boston Lowell family, founder of Lowell, Massachusetts
 Arthur Vining Davis (1884), president of Aluminum Company of America (1910–1949), major educational benefactor in  United States
 James Dole (1895), founder of the Hawaiian Company in Honolulu, Hawaii currently known as Dole Food Company
 Albert Hamilton Gordon (1919), Wall Street businessman, philanthropist
 David R. Godine (1960), publisher
 Roger Altman (1963), founder and chairman of Evercore

Sciences
 Charles Russell Lowell, Sr. (1796), Royal Society and Harvard University fellow
 Robert W. Wood (1887), American physicist, professor at Johns Hopkins University
 Edward Lee Thorndike (1891), famed psychologist, former professor at Columbia, member of National Academy of Sciences
 Paul Dudley White (1903), "Father of Modern Cardiology," noted cardiologist, founder of American Heart Association
 James B. Sumner (1906), noted chemist, recipient of 1946 Nobel Prize in Chemistry
 James Bryant Conant (1910), president of Harvard University, ambassador to Germany
 Marland P. Billings (1919), noted geologist, Penrose Medal winner, Harvard University professor
 Robert Ross Holloway  (1934), American archaeologist, Brown University professor
 Robert Angus Brooks (1936), noted American philologist and former Under Secretary of the Smithsonian Institution
 Jared Diamond (1954), noted biologist, author and Pulitzer Prize-winner for Guns, Germs, and Steel: The Fates of Human Societies
 Peter Derow (1961), voice alteration innovator, renowned historian, scholar; lecturer at Oxford University
 Harry Lewis (1964), dean of Harvard College, Harvard Professor
 Walter Bender (1973), former Executive Director of MIT Media Lab and founder of Sugar Labs

Arts, literature, and music
 Edmund M. Wheelwright (1872), architect, designer of Boston and Cambridge, Massachusetts landmarks such as Longfellow Bridge, Horticultural Hall, and Jordan Hall
 George Lyman Kittredge (1875), influential literary scholar and professor at Harvard University
 Frederick Law Olmsted, Jr. (1890), landscape architect and journalist
 William H. Littlefield (1920), abstract expressionist painter
 Peter Ivers (1964), musician, composer, host of New Wave Theatre
 John Semper Jr. (1970), writer, story-editor, producer focusing primarily on animation, children's television, and comedy such as Jay Jay the Jet Plane, Spider-Man: The Animated Series, and Class Act 
 William Landay (1981), novelist
 Christopher Payne (1986), photographer
 Adam Granduciel (1997), frontman and primary songwriter of The War on Drugs
 Stefan Jackiw (2003), classical violinist

Politics, military, and public service
 Edwin Upton Curtis (1878), 34th and youngest-ever Mayor of Boston
 Clifton Sprague (1913), U.S. Navy Admiral in World War 2 and Navy Cross recipient for leadership in Battle off Samar
 Richard W. Murphy (1947), former U.S. Ambassador to Saudi Arabia, Syria, Mauritania, Philippines, television commentator
 Richard Barnet (1948), activist, scholar, co-founder of the Institute for Policy Studies
 Christopher Lydon (1958), radio broadcaster and former host of NPR's "The Connection"
 Peter Rodman (1961), former Assistant Secretary of Defense
 Roger Altman (1963), deputy Secretary of Treasury in Clinton administration
 Michael J. Astrue (1974), former Commissioner of Social Security Administration
 Mark C. Storella (1977) Ambassador 
Ian Heath Gershengorn (1984), former Acting Solicitor General of the United States 
 Patrick F. Philbin (1985), Deputy Counsel to the President in the Office of White House Counsel in the Trump administration
 John R. Connolly (1991), former at-large member of Boston City Council

Athletics
 William Welles Hoyt (1894), medal winner in the pole vault at the 1896 Olympic Games in Athens
 Malcolm Whitman (1895), tennis star, U.S. open champion in 1898, 1899, and 1900, member of original Davis Cup team and of Tennis Hall of Fame
 Stuart McNay (2000), member of Team USA's sailing team in the 2008, 2012, and 2016 Olympics
 Aaron Maund (2008), MLS soccer player
 Danny O'Regan, professional hockey player currently in the Detroit Red Wings organization

See also

 
 Boston Latin School
 Brooklyn Latin School
 List of the oldest schools in the world
 David W. Frank, author and long-time Director of Dramatics

References

Further reading

External links
 Roxbury Latin School

1645 establishments in Massachusetts
Boys' schools in Massachusetts
Educational institutions established in the 1640s
High schools in Boston
History of Boston
Independent School League
Middle schools in Boston
Private high schools in Massachusetts
Private middle schools in Massachusetts
Roxbury, Boston